Lerista miopus  is a species of skink found in Western Australia.

References

Lerista
Reptiles described in 1867
Taxa named by Albert Günther